Vitaliy Khozhatelev (born 12 August 1967) is a retired Uzbekistani hammer thrower.

He won the bronze medal at the 1995 Asian Championships, and finished fourth at the 1998 Asian Games. He competed at the 1995 World Championships, the 1996 Olympic Games and the 2000 Olympic Games without reaching the final.

His personal best throw was 75.62 metres, achieved in June 2000 in Tashkent.

References

1967 births
Living people
Uzbekistani male hammer throwers
Athletes (track and field) at the 1996 Summer Olympics
Athletes (track and field) at the 2000 Summer Olympics
Olympic athletes of Uzbekistan
World Athletics Championships athletes for Uzbekistan
Athletes (track and field) at the 1998 Asian Games
Asian Games competitors for Uzbekistan
20th-century Uzbekistani people